Kempegowda International Airport  is an international airport serving Bangalore, the capital of Karnataka, India. It is owned and operated by Bengaluru International Airport Limited (BIAL), a public–private consortium. The airport opened in May 2008 as an alternative to increased congestion at HAL Airport, the original primary commercial airport serving the city. It is named after Kempe Gowda I, the founder of Bangalore. Kempegowda International Airport became Karnataka's first fully solar powered airport, developed by CleanMax Solar.

Kempegowda International Airport is the third-busiest airport by passenger traffic, air traffic movements and domestic and total cargo handled in India, behind the airports in Delhi and Mumbai, and is the 29th busiest airport in Asia. The airport offers connecting flights to all six inhabited continents, and direct flights to five of them.

The airport has two passenger terminals that handles both domestic and international operations, and two runways, the second of which was commissioned on 6 December 2019. The second terminal was inaugurated by Prime Minister Narendra Modi in December 2022 and began domestic operations in January 2023. It will handle international operations from 2023. There is also a cargo village and three cargo terminals. The airport serves as a hub for AIX Connect, Alliance Air, Go First, IndiGo, Star Air and DHL Aviation and is a focus city for Air India and SpiceJet.

History

Planning (1991–2004) 
It was the primary airport serving Bangalore city until 2008. Originally established in 1942 for military and defence purposes, HAL began domestic operations for the first time in the late 1970s. The unexpected popularity of the newly offered domestic flights encouraged rapid expansion of the airport. In the late 1990s, the first international flights started. Air India was the first airline to offer international flights, flying to Singapore. In 2000, the first foreign airline started operations from HAL Airport, with Royal Nepal Airlines to Kathmandu, followed by Lufthansa's A340 a year later from Germany. Several other major international carriers such as British Airways and Air France were already serving the old airport by 2005.

However, as Bangalore grew into the Silicon Valley of India and passenger traffic to the city rose, HAL Airport with a single runway and limited aircraft parking space was unable to cope with this increased traffic. In 2007 it saw a footfall of 8 million passengers, more than double its original capacity of 3.6 million. There was no room for expansion and the airport apron could only park six aircraft. In March 1991, former chairman of the National Airports Authority of India (NAAI) S. Ramanathan convened a panel to select the site for a new airport. The State Government made a proposal to build the airport with private assistance, which the Union Government approved in 1994. Finally in 1995, Airports Authority of India (AAI) and Government of Karnataka decided to call for international consortia to own, build and operate the new Greenfield airport of the city.

In December 1995, a consortium of Tata Group, Raytheon and Singapore Changi Airport signed a memorandum of understanding with the State Government regarding participation in the project. In June 1998, however, the consortium announced it was pulling out of the project due to delays in government approval. These included disputes over the location of the airport and the fate of HAL Airport.

In May 1999, the Airports Authority of India (AAI) and the Karnataka State Industrial and Infrastructure Development Corporation (KSIIDC) of the State Government signed a memorandum of understanding regarding the nature of the project. It would be a public–private partnership, with AAI and KSIIDC having a 26% share and private companies having the remaining 74%. In January 2001, the State Government created the company Bengaluru International Airport Limited (BIAL) as a special purpose entity and began searching for partners. By November, the project had attracted Unique Zürich Airport, Siemens Project Ventures and Larsen & Toubro. Construction was expected to begin in October 2002; however, governmental delays persisted. The concession agreement between the State Government, the Union Government and BIAL was signed in July 2004. In it, BIAL required the closure of HAL Airport.

It took nearly a decade from the initial stage of land allocation and acquisition, to signing of shareholder agreements in 2002 and until start of construction.

During the formation of legal framework, BIAL's main observation was the unprecedented growth that aviation industry faced.

Designing 
BIAL, when the project was first designated, had anticipated traffic of approximately 5 million in the first year of operations in 2008. However, HAL Airport had handled over 8 million passengers by the time the construction of the new greenfield airport started. It took more than nine months to redesign the process along with gaining the necessary approvals, and when the approval for increased project was sanctioned, the construction was half done. The project was well on track despite the challenge and was expected to be ready by its initial given open date.

The revised increased capacity project was constructed to cater to eleven million passengers per annum, up from the previous plan of 5 million passengers per annum. BIAL increased project had plans to build a terminal with eight passengers boarding bridges, one double arm aerobridge, nine remote bus gates and a runway measuring 4,000 metres with efficient taxiways. BIAL also planned to build an apron with 42 Code-C aircraft stands (with eight contact stands) as well as an air- and land-side road system. The estimated cost for the entire project was Rs 1,930 crore (approximately US$430 million).

Construction and opening (2005–2008) 
Construction finally commenced on 2 July 2005. When a study predicted the airport would receive 6.7 million passengers in 2008, the airport was redesigned from its initial capacity of 4.5 million passengers to 11 million, with the terminal size expanded and the number of aircraft stands increased. Construction was completed in 32 months, and BIAL set the launch date for 30 March 2008. However, due to delays in establishing air traffic control services at the airport, the launch date was pushed to 11 May and finally 24 May 2008.

As the opening date for the airport approached, public criticism arose, mainly directed toward the closure of HAL Airport. In March 2008, AAI employees conducted a massive strike against the closure of HAL Airport along with Begumpet Airport in Hyderabad, fearing they would lose their jobs. The Bangalore City Connect Foundation, a group of citizens and businessmen, staged a rally in mid-May, claiming the new airport was too small for the latest demand projections. On 23 May, a hearing was held at the Karnataka High Court over poor connectivity between the city and the airport. Ultimately, the State Government decided to go ahead with inaugurating the new airport and closing HAL Airport.

The first flight to the airport, Air India Flight 609 from Mumbai, was allowed to land the previous night as it would be continuing to Singapore shortly after midnight. The aircraft touched down at 10:40 pm on 23 May. The airport became the third greenfield airport under a public–private partnership to open in India, after Rajiv Gandhi International Airport in Hyderabad and Cochin International Airport.

Renaming and expansion (2009–present) 
The original name of the airport was Bengaluru International Airport. In February 2009, the State Government sent a proposal to the Union Government to rename the airport after the founder of Bangalore, Kempe Gowda I. When no action was taken, the State Government passed a resolution for the name change in December 2011. The Union Government accepted the proposal in 2012 and formally approved it in July 2013. The airport was officially renamed Kempegowda International Airport on 14 December 2013 amid the inauguration of the expanded terminal building.

Kingfisher Airlines once operated a hub and was one of the largest airlines at the airport. Following its collapse in October 2012, other airlines stepped in to fill the gap in domestic connectivity by adding more flights. In addition, Air Pegasus and AirAsia India (renamed as  AIX Connect in 2023) launched hub operations at the airport in 2014.

The first phase of expansion was launched in June 2011 and finished in December 2013. One domestic gate and three international gates were added as well. A large, sweeping roof connects the original building with the expanded areas. The expanded terminal, dubbed "Terminal 1A", has raised the annual passenger capacity of the airport to 25 million.

In September 2022, Qantas began flying to Sydney with Airbus A330s. This is the first nonstop service between Bangalore and Australia. The following month, Emirates introduced the Airbus A380, the world's largest passenger plane, on one of its flights to Dubai, marking Bangalore's first A380 service. Air India started a scheduled flight to San Francisco aboard Boeing 777 aircraft in December.

Ownership 
The airport is owned and operated by Bengaluru International Airport Limited (BIAL), a public limited company. The Government of India has granted BIAL the right to operate the airport for 30 years, with the option to continue for another 30 years. The company is a public–private consortium venture. GVK initially owned 43% of the shares in Bangalore Airport. In 2016, GVK decided to divest its 33% share of in BIAL to Fairfax Financial for ₹2149 cr. In March 2017, GVK confirmed having done so.

Finally, in January 2018, GVK decided to sell the remaining 10% shares to Fairfax Financial for ₹1,290 crore and exit Bangalore Airport completely.
 
26% is held by government entities Karnataka State Industrial Investment and Development Corporation (13%) and Airports Authority of India (13%), and 74% is held by private companies Fairfax Financial (54%) and Siemens Project Ventures (20%).
 
In March 2021 the Airports Authority of India announced their plans to sell their 13% stake in order to raise funds. Between FY 2022–2025, the Government aims to raise as much as ₹20,782 crore through aviation. The process will start with the selling of stakes of Bangalore Airport followed by Hyderabad, Mumbai and Delhi.

Facilities

Runways 
Kempegowda International Airport has two runways in use.

Four years after it was laid, the first runway (now designated 09L/27R) was entirely resurfaced because of a serious decline in quality. From 11 March to 3 April 2012, it was closed daily between 10:30 am and 5:30 pm. As a result, BIAL accused construction company Larsen & Toubro of building the runway poorly. South of runway 09L/27R are a full-length parallel taxiway and the apron, which extends from the Blue Dart/DHL terminal to the passenger terminal.

The construction of the second runway at the airport is now complete, and was officially in use from 6 December 2019, when an IndiGo airlines flight (6E 466) to Hyderabad took off from runway 09R. The runway will cater to all types of aircraft including Code-F aircraft like Airbus A380 and Boeing 747-8 and will be equipped with CAT IIIB ILS. The runway also features an associated parallel taxiway and two cross-field taxiways on the east linking the new runway to the existing north runway and the aprons at Terminal 1 and the upcoming Terminal 2. The first runway (09L/27R) was also upgraded as part of the expansion work.

The old runway (Runway 09L/27R) was closed from 22 June 2020 for nine months for rehabilitation and strengthening. The runway was opened for service again on 31 March 2021 and put into service with the south runway, making KIA the first airport in South India to have parallel runway operations.

Terminals

Terminal 1

A single integrated passenger terminal accommodates both domestic and international operations. Check-in and baggage reclaim areas are situated on the lower floor, while departure gates are located on the first floor. Gates 1, 2, 12–18, 28–30 on the first floor are used for domestic departures, gates 31–42 on the first floor are used for international departures, gates 3–9 and gates 19–25 form the Western and Eastern bus gates respectively. Gate 41–42 is equipped to serve the world's largest passenger aircraft, the Airbus A380. Lounges are provided by Travel Food Services, which also operates a transit hotel in the terminal. For VIPs there is a separate  lounge.

There are two lounges in Terminal 1, the 080 Domestic and the 080 International lounges. Named "080" after the trunk dial code of the city of Bengaluru, the lounges aim to pay an ode to the Garden City of Bengaluru with local artistry, culture-inspired interiors and botanical elements, each zone in the lounge is carefully crafted to bring alive the stories of the city it’s inspired by. Both the lounges are operated by Travel Food Services.

Terminal 2
The airport's second terminal, designed as a tribute to the "Garden City" of Bengaluru by Skidmore, Owings & Merrill and constructed by Larsen & Toubro was inaugurated on 11 November 2022, by Prime Minister Narendra Modi. The first phase of terminal 2, built at a cost of around ₹ 5,000 crore, with a size of 255,000 sq.m., will help augment the capacity of the airport by an additional 25 million passengers per annum. The second phase of terminal 2 is planned and is expected to provide an additional capacity of 20 million passengers per annum, thereby increasing the overall capacity of the terminal to over 45 million passengers per annum. Construction of the first phase of terminal 2 commenced in 2018, but the project faced delays owing to the COVID-19 pandemic.

The arrivals area of terminal 2 is situated on the ground floor, while departures are planned on the first floor. The first phase of terminal 2 features 95 check-in counters, 17 security check lanes, 9 baggage claim belts, 34 conventional and 6 electronic immigration gates. With provisions for tarmac gates and jet bridge gates, including Code-F gates to handle larger aircraft like the Airbus A380 and the Boeing 747-8, the first phase of terminal 2 will start with domestic operations on January 15, 2023, with Star Air (India) being the first airline to operate out of the new terminal. The terminal will eventually handle both domestic and international operations in the first half of 2023.

Technology & Sustainability were some of the key design goals of Terminal 2, with the terminal receiving a LEED Platinum certification from the U.S. Green Building Council.

Aviation fuel services 
It was built by IndianOil SkyTanking Ltd (IOSL) but is shared by multiple oil companies. In October 2008, Indian Oil commissioned a  fuel pipeline between its storage terminal in Devanagonthi and Kempegowda Airport. Previously, jet fuel had to be transported to the airport by tank trucks, which created traffic and pollution problems.

Cargo facilities 
Kempegowda Airport has three cargo terminals.

DHL and Blue Dart Aviation jointly operate a  terminal.

The third cargo terminal is operated by Menzies Aviation Bobba (Bangalore) Pvt. Ltd, a joint venture between Menzies Aviation and Bobba Group (a sales agency for Lufthansa Cargo). The 170,000 sq ft. cargo terminal began operations in May 2008.The terminal has the capacity to handle  tons of cargo annually.

BIAL inaugurated a separate cargo village in December 2008. It did not open for occupation until 2010 and initially suffered low occupancy, which some cargo agents attributed to the opening delay, high rent and limited infrastructure.

Other facilities

IndiGo Ifly Training Academy

On 4 September 2019, India's leading airline, IndiGo announced that it will extend its learning academy, ifly to Bangalore, its 2nd such facility in India. The facility will be built in the Airport campus.

Starting 6 September 2019, ifly facilitated training to the airline employees. With over 27,000 employees, there are over 100 instructors in  the academy, who conducts workshops on regular basis.

The Ifly learning academy of IndiGo Airlines facilitates special trainings throughout the year to its employees including required skills for job performance, customer services, ramp and marshalling training, safety and emergency procedures, departure control system, communication and leadership training and e-learning to name the few.

IndiGo Maintenance Repair and Overhaul Facility
IndiGo has its second facility to service their fleet of predominantly Airbus aircraft. The facility, which has a volume of around 218,000 ft.², has capacity for narrow-body aircraft and houses a single bay catering for widebody aircraft. The MRO is completed and is operational since November 2022.

Central Kitchen
Food services provider SATS proposed to setup their first central kitchen, a 14,000sqm facility with an investment of Rs. 210 crore to cater to the demand in the region. SATS already has a long standing partnership with the airport through its aviation catering associate Taj SATS and ground handling associate AISATS. The facility will be located at the Kempegowda International Airport and is expected to be operational in the year 2022.

Future plans 
The second phase of expansion is underway, which encompasses the construction of a second runway and a passenger terminal in two phases. When fully completed, Kempegowda International Airport will be able to handle 55 million passengers per year. The estimated  project received clearance from the Ministry of Environment, Forest and Climate Change (MoEFCC) in September 2014.

Ground work on the second runway began in February 2016 and the runway opened in December 2019. Located south of Terminal 1, it is parallel to runway 09/27 and measures , wider than the original runway so it can accommodate larger aircraft. The new runway is also CAT III certified, allowing for landings in fog and other low visibility conditions.

A second terminal has been constructed to meet the airport's expected growth. This terminal has been designed by Skidmore, Owings & Merrill, and the construction contract has been awarded to Larsen & Toubro. In the first phase, the terminal will cater to 25 million passengers annually, and in the second phase, it will cater another 20 million passengers annually. Terminal 2 was inaugurated in December 2022 and began operations in January 2023.

A third runway, north of the current runway is being planned to cater to the growth of air traffic in the airport which will be situated 1500 meters north of the current runway. Dubbed as the "New North Parallel Runway", the officials hope to ease air traffic congestion with the third runway.  Along with this, a third passenger terminal has also been proposed for the airport. It is expected to begin construction from 2034 and be completed in the late 2030s.

Airlines and destinations

Passenger

Cargo

Statistics

Connectivity

Road 
Kempegowda Airport is connected to the city of Bangalore by National Highway 44 (NH 44). In January 2014, a six-lane flyover was completed over NH 44 between Hebbal and the airport, helping to reduce travel time to and from the city. Two alternative routes are under construction and will be completed by March 2017, one through Thanisandra and the other through Hennur. The airport car park is located at ground level and can hold 2,000 vehicles. The airport is served by several taxi and rental car companies. In addition, ride-sharing companies Ola Cabs and Uber have their own pick-up zones outside the terminal.

The Bangalore Metropolitan Transport Corporation (BMTC) provides bus transportation to major parts of the city through the Vayu Vajra (Kannada for "Diamond in the Air") service. It is operated using a fleet of Volvo B7RLE buses. In addition, the Karnataka State Road Transport Corporation (KSRTC) operates a nonstop bus service called "Flybus" between Kempegowda Airport and Mysore, as well as a route to Manipal via Mangalore.

Rail 
A halt at the KIA boundary commenced operations in January 2021. The train halt is connected to the airport terminal via short five-minute shuttle busses. Every day five trains from the city towards Devanahalli stop at the KIA halt and five trains head back. Future plans include electrification of the route to introduce comfortable MEMU trains to the airport. MEMU trains from Mysore that terminate at Yelahanka could be extended up to Devanahalli via the KIA halt station, benefitting airport-bound passengers from Mysore, Channapatna, Ramanagaram and Bidadi.

Metro 
The plan to build a metro link between Bangalore and the airport with two stations at the airport was revived in 2020 and is now under construction. In January 2019, Karnataka Government approved the Bangalore Airport Metro line. The project which is envisioned to link Bangalore City with the airport is under Phase 2B of Namma Metro, and is 37 km long. The blue line also known as Line-5 (KR Puram-Hebbal-Kempegowda International Airport) will have 17 stations as an extension of Line-5 (ORR Line) via KR Puram, Nagawara, Hebbal And Yelahanka. The project is estimated to be completed by December 2024.

There are two metro stops being built in the airport campus, one near the upcoming Airport City, which will be partly elevated and the other one in the Multi Modal Transport Hub opposite the upcoming Terminal 2. The cost of building these two stations is estimated to be Rs 800 crore. The total cost of the project is expected to be Rs14,788 Crores.

To ensure last-mile connectivity for passengers, a service road will be provided around the Metro Stations in the Airport premises, for integration with BMTC buses. Plans are to build a 6m wide road.

High Speed Rail Link (HSRL)
In August 2021, Karnataka Chief Minister Basavaraj Bommai declared plans of building a High Speed Rail Link (HSRL) connecting the airport and the city. If constructed, the airport will be connected by three different railway lines: the Metro, Suburban rail and High-speed rail, making it a distinctive airport connected with all three (modes of transportation).

This is not the first time this is planned. Plans to build an HSRL was earlier planned in 2001 and was revived again in 2013, but was shelved both times due to issues in land acquisition and high costs involved. More recently, the plan has been revived, as the Chief Minister believes that this has been their dream and they are going to get it done as no international airport in the world has got all three (modes of transportation).

Awards
In 2017, the airport was ranked first in ensuring timely takeoffs and landings to and from the airport, as the Most Punctual Airport of India by the DGCA. In 2020, the airport was recognised as the Best Airport in the Asia-Pacific Region with 25 to 40 million passengers per year by Airports Council International. In December 2022, the airport was not only considered again as the most punctual airport of India, but it was ranked among the most punctual airports in the world, in which it ranked 20th, by Cirium, an aviation data analytics company. In March 2023, the airport was ranked first by the Airport Service Quality (ASQ) Survey for Arrivals, conducted by Airports Council International for 2022, globally.

See also 
 List of airports in India
 List of airports in Karnataka
 List of busiest airports in India

References

External links 

 
 Vayu Vajra Bus Timings to and from BIAL

Airports in Bangalore
Airports in Karnataka
International airports in India
2008 establishments in India
Airports established in 2008
Fairfax Financial